Bedinje is a village in the municipality of Kumanovo, North Macedonia.

Demographics
According to the 2002 census, the village had a total of 2327 inhabitants, and in the 2021 census the village had a total of 898 inhabitants.

Ethnic groups in the village include:

References

External links

Villages in Kumanovo Municipality
Albanian communities in North Macedonia